Gilchristella aestuaria, the Gilchrist's round herring or estuarine round-herring, is a member of the herring family Clupeidae that occurs off the coasts of Southern Africa.  It is the only species in its genus, which was named for John Dow Fisher Gilchrist (1866–1926).

Information
There are no indications of major threats to this species. It is considered to be of least concern for becoming an endangered species.

Size
The average length of the G. aestuaria as an unsexed male is about ten centimeters.

Habitat
The Gilchristella aestuaria can be found in a marine environment and in freshwater. The habitat is located in subtropical climates. This species is primarily found in estuaries, lagoons, lakes, and rivers.  It is considered an extremely important fish in estuaries of South Africa . This small sardine-like fish lives in large shoals and provides an important link in the food chain as a food source to larger fish and water birds. This fish does not survive in an aquarium, presumably dying from capture myopathy or stress.

Distribution
The Gilchristella aestuaria is distributed throughout the following areas:
Africa
Lake Piti
Mozambique
Southern African coast
Saldanha Bay
Orange River
Namibia
South Africa 
Eastern Cape Province
KwaZulu-Natal
Northern Cape Province

References

External links

Gilchrist's round herring
Marine fauna of Southern Africa
Gilchrist's round herring
Taxa named by John Dow Fisher Gilchrist
Monotypic fish genera
Monotypic marine fish genera
Monotypic ray-finned fish genera